The 2003 PBA All-Star Weekend was the annual all-star weekend of the Philippine Basketball Association (PBA)'s 2003 PBA season. The events were held from May 30 to June 1, 2003 at the Araneta Coliseum, Cubao, Quezon City.

Skills challenge

2-Ball Challenge

Three-point shootout

Obstacle Challenge
Time in seconds.

Slam Dunk competition

Crispa-Toyota reunion game

Rosters

Crispa Redmanizers
Romulo Mamaril
Mon Cruz
Bay Cristobal
Philip Cezar
Atoy Co
Bernie Fabiosa
Abet Guidaben
Bogs Adornado
Freddie Hubalde
Rey Pages
Willy Tanduyan
Rey Franco
Bong Dela Cruz
Tito Varela
Joy Dionisio
Itoy Esguerra
Dave Brodett
Coach: Baby Dalupan

Toyota Tamaraws
Terry Saldaña
Chito Loyzaga
Ed Cordero
Sonny Jaworski
Ramon Fernandez
Gil Cortez
Emer Legaspi
Pol Herrera
Boy Clarino
Tino Reynoso
Orly Bauzon
Oscar Rocha
Rolly Marcelo
Ulysses Rodriguez
Ed Camus
Ompong Segura
Coach: Dante Silverio

Game
{{basketballbox |bg=#eee
  | date = May 30
  | time = 
  | report = 
  | team1 = Toyota Tamaraws
  | points1=
  | points2=
  | score1 = 65
  | Q1 = 16–14
  | Q2 = 18–11
  | Q3 = 13–17  | Q4 = 18–19  | score2 = 61
  | team2 = Crispa Redmanizers
  | place = Araneta Coliseum, Quezon City
  | attendance = 
  | TV = NBN/IBC
  | series = Terry Saldaña was named the game's most valuable player.
}}

All-star game
RostersCommissioner's All-Stars:Willie Miller (Red Bull)
Jimmy Alapag (Talk 'N Text)
Eric Menk (Brgy. Ginebra)
Asi Taulava (Talk 'N Text)
Jeffrey Cariaso (Coca-Cola)
Chris Calaguio (Sta. Lucia)
Lordy Tugade (Red Bull)
Rudy Hatfield (Coca-Cola)
Chris Jackson (Shell)
Mick Pennisi (Red Bull)
Enrico Villanueva (Red Bull)
Coach: Yeng Guiao (Red Bull)Governors' All-Stars:'''
Kenneth Duremdes (Sta. Lucia)
John Arigo (Alaska)
Danny Ildefonso (San Miguel)
Vergel Meneses (FedEx)
Marlou Aquino (Sta. Lucia)
Dondon Hontiveros (San Miguel)
Olsen Racela (San Miguel)
Kerby Raymundo (Purefoods)
Dennis Espino (Sta. Lucia)
Mike Cortez (Alaska)
Don Allado (Alaska)
Nic Belasco (San Miguel)
Coach: Derrick Pumaren (FedEx)

Game

References

All-Star Weekend
Philippine Basketball Association All-Star Weekend